Heath is a former civil parish, now in the parish of Abdon and Heath, in Shropshire, England. It contains nine listed buildings that are recorded in the National Heritage List for England. Of these, one is listed at Grade I, the highest of the three grades, and the others are at Grade II, the lowest grade. The parish contains the hamlet of Heath and is otherwise entirely rural. The most important listed building in the parish is the Norman Heath Chapel, which is listed at Grade I, and the other listed buildings are all farmhouses and farm buildings.

Key

Buildings

References

Citations

Sources

1383727

Lists of buildings and structures in Shropshire